The Florida Senate is the upper house of the Florida Legislature, the state legislature of the U.S. state of Florida, the Florida House of Representatives being the lower house. Article III, Section 1 of the Constitution of Florida, adopted in 1968, defines the role of the Legislature and how it is to be constituted. The Senate is composed of 40 members, each elected from a single-member district with a population of approximately 540,000 residents. Legislative districts are drawn on the basis of population figures, provided by the federal decennial census. Senators' terms begin immediately upon their election. The Senate Chamber is located in the State Capitol building.

Following the November 2022 elections, Republicans hold a supermajority in the chamber with 28 seats; Democrats are in the minority with 12 seats.

Titles
Members of the Senate are referred to as Senators. Because this shadows the terminology used to describe members of the U.S. Senate, constituents and the news media, using The Associated Press Stylebook, often refer to them as State Senators to avoid confusion with their federal counterparts.

Terms
Article III, of the Florida Constitution, defines the terms for State Legislators. The Constitution requires State Senators from odd-numbered districts to be elected in the years that end in numbers of which are multiples of four. Senators from even-numbered districts are required to be elected in even-numbered years the numbers of which are not multiples of four.

To reflect the results of the U.S. Census and the redrawing of district boundaries, all seats are up for election in redistricting years, with some terms truncated as a result. Thus, senators in odd-numbered districts were elected to two-year terms in 2022 (following the 2020 Census), and senators in odd-numbered districts will be elected to two-year terms in 2032 (following the 2030 Census).

Legislators take office immediately upon election.

Term limits
In a referendum on November 3, 1992, 77% of Florida voters backed Amendment 9, the Florida Term Limits Amendment, which amended the Florida State Constitution, to enact eight-year term limits on federal and state officials. Under the Amendment, former members could be elected again after a two-year break. In 1995, the U.S. Supreme Court ruled in U.S. Term Limits, Inc. v. Thornton that states could not enact congressional term limits, but ruled that the state-level term limits could remain.

Qualifications
Florida legislators must be at least twenty-one years old, an elector and resident of their district, and must have resided in Florida for at least two years prior to election.

Legislative session

Each year during which the Legislature meets constitutes a new legislative session.

Committee weeks
Legislators start committee activity in September of the year prior to the regular legislative session. Because Florida has a part-time legislature, this is necessary to allow legislators time to work their bills through the committee process, prior to the regular session.

Regular legislative session
The Florida Legislature meets in a 60-day regular legislative session each year. Regular sessions in odd-numbered years must begin on the first Tuesday after the first Monday in March. Under the State Constitution, the Legislature can begin even-numbered year regular sessions at a time of its choosing.

Prior to 1991, regular sessions began in April. Senate Joint Resolution 380 (1989) proposed to the voters a constitutional amendment (approved November 1990) that shifted the starting date of regular sessions from April to February. Subsequently, Senate Joint Resolution 2606 (1994) proposed to the voters a constitutional amendment (approved November 1994) shifting the start date to March, where it remains. The reason for the "first Tuesday after the first Monday" requirement stems back to the time when sessions began in April. Sessions could start any day from April 2 through April 8, but never on April 1 -- April Fool's Day. In recent years, the Legislature has opted to start in January in order to allow lawmakers to be home with their families during school spring breaks, and to give more time ahead of the legislative elections in the Fall.

Organizational session
On the fourteenth day following each general election, the Legislature meets for an organizational session to organize and select officers.

Special session
Special legislative sessions may be called by the governor, by a joint proclamation of the Senate president and House speaker, or by a three-fifths vote of all legislators. During a special session, the Legislature may only address legislative business that is within the purpose or purposes stated in the proclamation calling the session.

Powers and process
The Florida Senate is authorized by the Florida Constitution to create and amend the laws of the U.S. state of Florida, subject to the Governor's power to veto legislation. To do so, Legislators propose legislation in the forms of bills drafted by a nonpartisan, professional staff. Successful legislation must undergo committee review, three readings on the floor of each house, with appropriate voting majorities, as required, and either be signed into law by the Governor or enacted through a veto override approved by two-thirds of the membership of each legislative house.

Its statutes, called "chapter laws" or generically as "slip laws" when printed separately, are compiled into the Laws of Florida and are called "session laws". The Florida Statutes are the codified statutory laws of the state.

In 2009, legislators filed 2,138 bills for consideration. On average, the Legislature has passed about 300 bills into law annually.

In 2013, the legislature filed about 2000 bills. About 1000 of these are "member bills." The remainder are bills by committees responsible for certain functions, such as budget. In 2016, about 15% of the bills were passed.
In 2017, 1,885 lobbyists registered to represent 3,724 entities.

The Senate also has the power to propose Amendments to the Florida Constitution. Additionally, the Senate has the exclusive power to try officials impeached by the House, and to confirm some executive appointments.

Leadership
The Senate is headed by the Senate President. The Senate President controls the assignment of committees and leadership positions, along with control of the agenda in their chamber. The Senate President, along with the Speaker of the House and Governor, control most of the agenda of state business in Florida.

President: Kathleen Passidomo (R)
President Pro Tempore:             Dennis Baxley (R)
Majority Leader:                       Ben Albritton (R)
Minority Leader:                       Lauren Book (D)

Composition

Members, 2022–2024

District map

Past composition of the Senate

See also
Florida State Capitol
Florida Senate Majority Office
Government of Florida
List of presidents of the Florida Senate
Major parties:
Florida Democratic Party
Republican Party of Florida

Notes

References

External links

 
Florida Legislature
1839 establishments in Florida Territory
State upper houses in the United States